In the 2007–08 season Motagua won their first international trophy in the 2007 UNCAF Interclub Cup, and were the league's runner-up in the Apertura tournament being beaten by C.D. Marathón.  They were the only team to beat C.D. Victoria, doing so twice.  In the Clausura tournament they reached the Semifinals. They also competed in the last CONCACAF Champions' Cup.

Squad

Transfer in

Transfer out

Apertura

Motagua played its first official game of the season at home with a 2–0 victory over Atlético Olanchano.

Standings

Matches

Results by round

Regular season

Semifinals

 Motagua won 3–1 on aggregate.

Final

 Motagua lost 0–2 on aggregate.

Clausura

Motagua reached the semifinals. The team had to play some of their home games at Estadio Marcelo Tinoco in Danlí due to major repairs to the Estadio Tiburcio Carías Andino for the 2010 World Cup qualification.

Standings

Matches

Matches by round

Regular season

Semifinals

 Motagua lost 2–7 on aggregate.

2007 UNCAF Interclub Cup
As champions in the 2006–07 Apertura season, F.C. Motagua had the right to participate in the Central American club championship in 2007.  Under the management of DT Ramón Maradiaga, the team achieved a record 7 wins and 1 drawn in a total of 8 games, and won their first international trophy.

Matches

First round

 Motagua won 5–1 on aggregate.

Quarterfinals

 Motagua won 2–0 on aggregate.

Semifinals

 Motagua won 6–3 on aggregate.

Final

 Motagua won 2–1 on aggregate.

2008 CONCACAF Champions' Cup
After winning the 2007 UNCAF Interclub Cup, F.C. Motagua obtained one of the three Central American tickets to the 2008 CONCACAF Champions' Cup.  On 17 December 2008 CONCACAF announced the pairs for the Quarterfinals, leaving Motagua in the bracket against reigning champions C.F. Pachuca.

Matches

Quarterfinals

 Motagua lost 0–1 on aggregate.

References

External links
Motagua Official Website

F.C. Motagua seasons
Motagua
Motagua